Stephen Edward Robinson (May 23, 1947 – June 17, 2018) was a religious scholar and apologist, who was a member of the Church of Jesus Christ of Latter-day Saints (LDS Church).

Biography 

Stephen E. Robinson was born and raised in Southern California (La Crescenta/La Canada) and served a two-year mission for the LDS Church in the Northern States Mission (Illinois, Iowa, and Wisconsin). In 1972, he married Janet Bowen (B.A., B.S., CPA), and they have six children. He has been a member of the faculty at Brigham Young University (BYU) since 1986, and he was appointed chairman of the Department of Ancient Scripture there in 1990.  Robinson received a B.A. in English and Philosophy from the BYU Honors Program in 1971, graduating with "High Honors with Distinction."  He received a Ph.D. in Biblical Studies and Classics from Duke University in 1978, and was tenured at Lycoming College in 1984, after teaching religion there, at Hampden–Sydney College, at UNC-Chapel Hill, and Duke.  Robinson also served as chairman of the Scholars Program, of the Religion Department, and of the Faculty Senate at Lycoming. He has published in scholarly venues such as the Society of Biblical Literature, Revue de Qumran, the Coptic Encyclopedia, Journal for the Study of Judaism, and the Anchor Bible Dictionary. Robinson also has several popular books, Are Mormons Christians?, Believing Christ (the "Best Book" Award-winner at ILDS Booksellers for 1995), Following Christ (the "Best Book" at ILDSB for 1996), and How Wide the Divide? (a "Best Book" Award-winner at Christianity Today in 1997).  He has received numerous awards for his research, teaching, and writing.  Robinson retired in 2012 and received emeritus status at BYU.

Besides his professional work in Biblical Studies, Robinson is also widely known for his ecumenical dialogue with non-Mormon scholars.  He was the first practicing Latter-day Saint to be tenured in Religion at a non-Mormon institution (Lycoming College).  Robinson and Craig Blomberg, an Evangelical New Testament scholar at the Denver Seminary, co-authored an important book on LDS/Evangelical relations entitled How Wide the Divide? (1997), which in turn led to an ongoing series of friendly and objective exchanges between LDS and traditional Christian scholars.

Robinson died June 17, 2018.

Controversy 
In LDS circles, Robinson is generally considered to be orthodox and to have a reliable grasp of LDS doctrine.  He came to the center of a conflict between the Foundation for Ancient Research and Mormon Studies (FARMS) and Salt Lake City publisher Signature Books, through his critical review of the writing of Dan Vogel, by describing it as being patterned after the teachings of Korihor, an atheist orator in the Book of Mormon. According to Daniel C. Peterson, then editor of the FARMS Review, FARMS tried to quiet down the counter-attack by Signature Books by emphasizing that Robinson's review was directed at the methodology of the writings and not the beliefs or character of the authors reviewed.

Bibliography
Books
 
 
 
 
 
 
 

Other writings

References

External links 
 

1947 births
2018 deaths
American historians of religion
American male non-fiction writers
American Latter Day Saint writers
Brigham Young University alumni
Brigham Young University faculty
Duke Divinity School alumni
Historians of the Latter Day Saint movement
Lycoming College faculty
Mormon apologists
Latter Day Saints from Utah
Latter Day Saints from North Carolina
Latter Day Saints from Pennsylvania
Latter Day Saint biblical scholars